Maximilian Entrup (born September 15, 1997) is an Austrian footballer currently playing for FCM Traiskirchen.

External links
 
 

1997 births
Living people
Austrian footballers
Austria youth international footballers
Floridsdorfer AC players
SK Rapid Wien players
SKN St. Pölten players
SV Lafnitz players
Association football forwards
Austrian Football Bundesliga players
2. Liga (Austria) players
Austrian Regionalliga players